Paddy Roe  (1912 (estimate) – 2001), also known as Lulu was an Aboriginal Elder of the Goolarabooloo tribe (also spelt Gularabulu) of the Nyigina (also spelt Nyikina, and listed as Njikena by Tindale) ethnic group in Australia. He was an author who won the Western Australian Week Literary Award in 1985, and was short-listed for the National Book Council Award in 1983, and the New South Wales Premier's Literary Award in 1985. He was awarded the Medal of the Order of Australia in the 1990 Australia Day Honours for "service to Aboriginal welfare". He has collaborated on works such as Gularabulu, Stories from the West Kimberley and others.

Paddy Roe was born, and grew up on Roebuck Plains Station, near Broome. He worked as a drover and also a windmill repairer around the Kimberley.

Roe established the Lurujarri Heritage Trail in 1987 and the Lurujarri Heritage Trail is part of the Heritage Trails Network, a project for community participation originally devised by the Western Australian Heritage Committee (now known as the Heritage Council of Western Australia) in commemoration of the 1988 Bicentenary.

Works
Gularabulu: Stories from the West Kimberley, Stephen Muecke (editor), Fremantle Arts Centre Press, 1983, 
"Paddy Roe: Storyteller", by Paddy Roe, in Aboriginal Voices: Contemporary Aboriginal artists, writers and performers, compiled by Liz Thompson

References

1910s births
2001 deaths
Indigenous Australian writers
Indigenous Australians from Western Australia
Recipients of the Medal of the Order of Australia
People from the Kimberley (Western Australia)